The Prague derby or Derby of the Prague S is a football match between local Prague rivals SK Slavia Prague and AC Sparta Prague. The two clubs are considered to be the most successful in the Czech football, having won league and cup titles multiple times. The two were both founded in the late 19th century, Slavia one year before their rivals in 1892, though Slavia did not play football until four years later. The first match between the teams was played on 29 March 1896, with the game finishing 0–0. The two clubs are the most successful and famous in the country and their dominance has led the derby to be referred in a similar way as the Scottish Old Firm.

As of 5 December 2021 the fixture has been played 303 times. Sparta have won 136 of those matches, 72 ended as a draw and Slavia have won 95.

This derby occasionally also includes FK Dukla Prague or Bohemians 1905.

Statistics and records
Updated 6 March 2022

List of matches

League

Cup

Goalscorers
Top goal scorers since 1998–99 season

Head-to-head ranking league

References

General

Association football rivalries
SK Slavia Prague
AC Sparta Prague
Football in the Czech Republic
Sport in Prague
1896 establishments in Austria-Hungary
19th-century establishments in Bohemia